Senator Watts may refer to:

A. D. Watts (1867–1927), North Carolina State Senate
Cornelius Clarkson Watts (1848–1930), West Virginia State Senate
Eugene J. Watts (1942–2008), Ohio State Senate

See also
Senator Watt (disambiguation)